The Women's high jump event  at the 2011 European Athletics Indoor Championships was held on March 5–6, 2011 with the final on March 6 at 15:30.

Records

Results

Qualification
Qualification: Qualification Performance 1.94 (Q) or at least 8 best performers advanced to the final.

Final
The final was held at 15:30.

References

High jump at the European Athletics Indoor Championships
2011 European Athletics Indoor Championships
2011 in women's athletics